The Bartlesville Examiner-Enterprise is a daily newspaper in Bartlesville, Oklahoma. It was owned and published by Stephens Media LLC until 2015, when the Stephens Media newspapers were sold to New Media Investment Group, the parent company of GateHouse Media.

Additionally, the Bartlesville Examiner-Enterprise also designs and prints the Pawhuska Journal-Capital, Bartlesville Magazine, and Hometown Shopper from its plant in Bartlesville.

Sister Oklahoma publications include The Oklahoman, The Journal Record, Daily Ardmoreite, Shawnee News-Star, and Miami News Record.

Subsidiary Publications 
 Bartlesville Magazine,
 Pawhuska Journal-Capital, 
 Hometown Shopper (Washington & Osage Counties),

References

External links
Examiner-Enterprise official web site
GateHouse Media official web site

Newspapers published in Oklahoma
Gannett publications